The New South Wales Waratahs Women are an Australian rugby union team that represents New South Wales in the Super W competition. They are the most successful team so far, having won four titles.

History

Super W announced 
In 2017, Rugby Australia announced that a national women's rugby competition would commence in March 2018, with the New South Wales Waratahs to have a women's team. The announcement was made on the same day that Rugby Australia outlined its intentions to bid for the 2021 Women's Rugby World Cup.

Inaugural season 
The Waratahs Women were hosted by the Queensland Reds Women at Suncorp Stadium in Brisbane for the season’s opener. It was a double header with the Super Rugby match between the Queensland Reds and the Bulls.

Inaugural champions 
On 20 April 2018, the women's New South Wales Waratahs made history by winning the first season of women's 15-a-side rugby, with captain Ashleigh Hewson kicking the winning penalty goal in the ninety-second minute. New South Wales Waratahs Women's were victorious over the Queensland Reds 16–13 at Stadium Australia.

Current squad 
On 9 February 2022, the squad for the 2022 season was announced.

Season standings

Coaching staff 

 Head Coach: Campbell Aitken
 Assistant Coach: Ben Whittaker
 Assistant Coach: Pete Hammond

References

External links 

 Official website

2017 establishments in Australia
Rugby clubs established in 2017
Women's rugby union teams in Australia
Super W
Rugby union teams in Sydney
New South Wales Waratahs